Lingwai Daida, variously translated as Representative Answers from the Region beyond the Mountains, Notes Answering [Curious Questions] from the land beyond the Pass or other similar titles, is a 12th-century geographical treatise written by Zhou Qufei.  It contains information on the geography, history, social custom and economy of territories of southern China, Guangxi in particular.  More significantly it also provides knowledge of distant lands in China during the Song dynasty, and includes descriptions of oversea states as far away as Africa and southern Spain.

Background
The book was written in 1178 by Zhou Qufei. Zhou based his book largely on information he had gathered himself and other previous published works, particularly a book written by Fan Chengda.  He worked for 6 years in Guangxi; and had worked as an assistant sub-prefect in Guilin, Guangxi. In Guilin, Zhou served for a time under Fan Chengda who wrote a book on the southern region of China, Guihai yuheng zhi (桂海虞衡志, "Well-balanced Records of Guihai").  Zhou received a copy of Fan's book while he was revising his own book to finish it, and he quoted extensively from Fan's work. The book also includes quotes from Huanghua Sida Ji (皇華四達記) by the Tang dynasty geographer Jia Dan.

Zhou had also worked as an Educational Commissioner in Qinzhou, a port in Guangxi, where he had the opportunity to question traders, sailors as well as interpreters for foreign merchants. He added the information on distance lands he had gathered in two chapters of the book he wrote.

The original book is lost, and the current version was recompiled from entries in the Yongle Encyclopedia.

Content
There are ten chapters in the book, which concentrates mostly on the history, geography, custom and products of Guangxi, and it also contains information on southwest China, the Leizhou Peninsula of Guangdong as well as Hainan Island. It remains today an important reference for Guangxi of the Song era.

Of particular interest are the two chapters that included descriptions of countries outside of China as well as their traded products.  Some of these are among the earliest accounts of distant countries as far away as Africa in Chinese records.  As the information on foreign countries was gathered secondhand, the accounts given in the book contain some exaggerations, inaccuracies and fanciful tales, but it gives a fairly accurate configuration of land and sea stretching from Korea to Spain.

Some of the entries in the book were incorporated or adapted into Zhao Rugua's book Zhu Fan Zhi, for example this description of Mulanpi (木蘭皮, Al-Murabitun) that covered part of northwest Africa (Morocco) and southern Spain, and it includes an early Chinese reference to northern Europe:

Translations
A German translation, Das Ling-wai-tai-ta von Chou Ch'ü-fei: Eine Landeskunde Südchinas aus dem 12. Jahrhundert, by Almut Netolitzky was published in 1977. An annotated English translation of the geographical chapters by the Italian scholar Victoria Almonte was published in 2020, as The Historical Value of the Work Lingwai Daida by Zhou Qufei (Rome, Italy: Aracne, 2020).

Notes

See also
Zhu Fan Zhi
Daoyi Zhilüe

References

External links

 Lingwai Daida

1170s books
Chinese prose texts